Kudachi is a town municipal corporation in Belagavi district in Karnataka.

Demographics
 India census,
Kudachi had a population of 23,154. Males constitute 52% of the population and females 48%. Kudachi has an average literacy rate of 68%, lower than the national average of 74.9%: male literacy is 60%, and female literacy is 46%. In Kudachi, 16% of the population is under 6 years of age.

The major source of income in this small town is agriculture, mainly sugar cane.  Kudachi is near to the sugar works located in the town of Ugar (9 km).  This small town is famous for many things, including its sugar cane crop, tasty brinjal, its different culture, and its many religious places or dargahs.

Land of Sufi Saints
Shrine of Hazrat Maasaheba Ashrafe Dojahan R.A., Kudachi/Kudchi, Karnataka - India

Often Kudachi is referred to as a land of sufi saints because this town has been blessed by many sufi saints in the past.
Shaikh Sirajuddin Junaidi Rahmatulla Alaih to whom the town of Kudachi was granted in Inam in the year 1370 A.D.
In his name an annual festival called 'Gadda' is celebrated for at least a week.
Hazrat Maasaheba Ashrafe Dojahan Rahmatulla Alaih came to 'Kudachi' from Balkh - Afghanistan and settled here.
Hazrat Maasaheba's Dargah in 'Kudachi' is a famous tourist destination.

Economy

Kudachi is a town located on the banks of river Krishna River, agriculture is the predominant occupation and is a single largest contributor to Kudachi's economy. The main crops grown are sugarcane, corn, jowar, wheat, pulses and Kudachi brinjal.

Travel
It is 105 km from Belgaum which is situated in karnataka state of India.
It can also be accessed from Miraj, which is 37 km from Kudachi.
One can reach Kudachi from anywhere in India by rail and road. 
The nearest airport to Kudachi is Belgaum and kolhapur.

References 

2. http://al-aqeedah.com/index.php?option=com_content&view=article&id=51:islam-and-shirk-are-opposites&catid=34:articles&Itemid=53 Islam and shirk are opposites

Cities and towns in Belagavi district